The Distortion of Sound is a 2014 advertisement for Harman produced by Vice Media. The advertisement presents itself as a documentary on the decline of sound quality in music distributed with lossy compression algorithms. The ad features paid interviews with vocalists, guitarists, producers, writers, rappers, film composers, mixing engineers, mixers, music journalists, acoustic researchers, loudspeaker engineers and chief engineers—including such artists as Mike Shinoda of Linkin Park, Slash, Quincy Jones, Snoop Dogg and Steve Aoki.

The ad was uploaded to YouTube using YouTube's lossy audio compression. The trailer of the film was also available on YouTube. The ad, as well as a trailer, was available on the official website of the film.

The film was premiered at a paid event in Los Angeles on July 10, 2014.

Cast
The film includes the following various musical artists:
 Quincy Jones
 Slash
 Snoop Dogg 
 Steve Aoki 
 Lianne La Havas
 Mike Shinoda
 Hans Zimmer
 Kate Nash
 A. R. Rahman
 Dan the Automator 
 Manny Marroquin
 Andrew Scheps
 Neil Strauss 
 Dr. Sean Olive
 Greg Timbers
 Chris Ludwig

Clips
The original film included clips of interviews. All the clips were uploaded separately on the official YouTube channel in the given sequences.

Music
The original score for the film was composed by Lorne Balfe. Whereas the film used only three songs out of which one is the collaboration between Linkin Park and Steve Aoki, and the other two songs are performed by Lianne La Havas. Whereas the song "Holding Company (Lost in the Echo 2011 Demo)" from the LP Underground XIII extended play was briefly used in the trailer for the film.

References

Documentary films about the music industry
Documentary films about technology
2014 films
2014 documentary films
American documentary films
Sound recording technology
2010s English-language films
2010s American films